3 Doors Down is an American rock band from Escatawpa, Mississippi, formed in 1996. The band originally consisted of Brad Arnold (lead vocals, drums), Matt Roberts (lead guitar, backing vocals) and Todd Harrell (bass guitar). The band rose to international fame with their first single, "Kryptonite", which placed in the top three on the Billboard Hot 100 chart. The band then signed with Republic Records and released their debut album, The Better Life, in 2000. The album was the 11th-best-selling album of the year and was certified 7× platinum in the United States. The group was later joined by drummer Richard Liles, who played during the tour for their first album.

The band's second album, Away from the Sun (2002), continued the band's success; it debuted at No. 8 on the Billboard 200 chart, went multi-platinum in the U.S. like its predecessor, and spawned the hits "When I'm Gone" and "Here Without You". The band toured extensively for two years. Daniel Adair played drums on tour from 2002 to 2006. This configuration played nearly 1,000 shows across the world following the release of Away from the Sun. In 2005, Greg Upchurch (Puddle of Mudd) joined to play drums to replace Adair. 3 Doors Down released their third album, Seventeen Days, in 2005. The album debuted at No. 1 on the Billboard 200 chart and was certified platinum within one month of release. The band continued their success with their next two albums, 3 Doors Down (2008) and Time of My Life (2011), debuting at No. 1 and No. 3 respectively on the Billboard 200 chart. Their latest album, Us and the Night, was released in 2016; they were working on new material for a seventh studio album as of 2019.

The band has been primarily described as post-grunge and alternative rock, while occasionally crossing into hard rock, and Southern rock. Their lyrical content contains overarching themes of angst, rebellion, revenge, yearning, and abandonment. 3 Doors Down has sold 30 million copies worldwide.

Original guitarist Matt Roberts departed in 2012, owing to health issues, before passing away in 2016. He was replaced by Chet Roberts, who was formerly Chris Henderson's guitar tech. Harrell was fired from the band in 2013 after being charged with vehicular homicide, and was replaced by bassist Justin Biltonen.

History

Formative years: 1996–1998
3 Doors Down initially consisted of Brad Arnold as the lead vocalist and drummer, Matt Roberts as the lead guitarist and backing vocalist, and Todd Harrell as the bass guitarist. The band began to tour outside Escatawpa, Mississippi, eventually coming up with their official name during a trip to Foley, Alabama. When the three were walking through the town, they saw a building where some letters had fallen off its sign, reading "Doors Down". Since the band consisted of three people at the time, they added the "3" to create "3 Doors Down". The cover of their 2011 album Time of My Life hints at the original number of band members (3) and current band members (5); the clock on the album cover reads 3:05.

A couple of years after performing together, Todd Harrell asked rhythm guitarist Chris Henderson to join the band in 1998. 3 Doors Down recorded a demo CD of their original songs at Lincoln Recording in Pascagoula, Mississippi. When the band gave the CD to local radio station WCPR-FM, they started playing the EP version of "Kryptonite" and it became the No. 1 requested song on the station for over 15 weeks. The station's program director sent the song to manager Phin Daly who in turn showed it to Bill McGathy, his employer at In De Goot Entertainment. The band was booked in New York to perform a showcase at the CBGB music club. Daly told HitQuarters: "Once they got on stage and started playing it was apparent the magic was in the music. So we moved to sign them."

Mainstream success: 1999–2004
3 Doors Down's first studio album, The Better Life, was released on February 8, 2000, and went on to become the 11th best-selling album of the year, selling over three million copies. It has since been certified 6× platinum, thanks in large part to the international hit singles, "Kryptonite", "Loser", and "Duck and Run". A fourth single, "Be Like That" was re-recorded for the 2001 film American Pie 2, with alternate lyrics for the first three lines; this version is known as the "American Pie 2 Edit". Whilst recording the album, Brad Arnold recorded both the vocal and drum tracks. The band hired drummer Richard Liles for the tour in support of The Better Life so that Arnold could perform at the front of the stage. Liles left in late 2001.

The band's second studio album, Away from the Sun, was released on November 12, 2002, and went platinum within two months of release.  The album also produced singles, including "When I'm Gone", "Here Without You", and "The Road I'm On". The album has sold four million copies worldwide, including well over three million in the U.S. Session drummer Josh Freese was hired to record drums for the album. Rush guitarist Alex Lifeson produced and performed on three tracks for the record, "Dangerous Game", "Dead Love", and "Wasted Me", but only "Dangerous Game" would appear on the finished product. The band hired Canadian Daniel Adair to play drums for the Away From the Sun tour. He would go on to record the drums for the band's next studio release, and was with the band aboard the USS George Washington (CVN-73) to film the music video "When I'm Gone".

In 2003, 3 Doors Down released a live EP entitled Another 700 Miles consisting of recordings from a live performance by the band in Chicago, Illinois. Another 700 Miles has since been certified Gold in the United States. In addition to featuring some of 3 Doors Down's hit singles from their previous two albums, the EP also contains a version of the popular 1977 Lynyrd Skynyrd song "That Smell". The group toured with Nickelback in 2004.

In 2003, the band began hosting the annual "3 Doors Down and Friends" benefit concert, through the band's own charity The Better Life Foundation. In 2006, this event was held at the Mobile Convention Center, with proceeds benefiting Hurricane Katrina survivors. As residents of Escatawpa, the members of the band saw the effects of Katrina's devastation.

Continued success: 2005–2010

By 2005, the band had sold 12 million albums. The band's third studio album, 2005's Seventeen Days, has been certified platinum. Of the singles from it, "Let Me Go" and "Behind Those Eyes" charted with the most success. "Live for Today", "Landing in London" (on which Bob Seger sang the second verse and provided back-up vocals), and "Here by Me" were also released as singles. During the Seventeen Days tour, the band appeared alongside southern rock band Lynyrd Skynyrd, as well as headlining many shows of their own.

Later in 2005, the band released a live DVD entitled Away from the Sun: Live from Houston, Texas. The DVD was produced and directed by Academy Award-nominated Alex Gibney and Doug Biro. It features songs from both The Better Life and Away from the Sun, and even some early sketches of "It's Not Me" and "Father's Son", which were both eventually released on Seventeen Days.

Greg Upchurch, formerly of Puddle of Mudd, replaced Daniel Adair in 2005, when Adair left to become drummer and contributing member of Nickelback.

3 Doors Down released their self-titled fourth album on May 20, 2008. It debuted at No. 1 on the Billboard 200, selling 154,000 copies in its first week. It is the band's second consecutive No. 1 album on the chart after Seventeen Days, as well their fourth album to reach the Top Ten. The album contains the hit singles "It's Not My Time", "Train", "Let Me Be Myself" and "Citizen/Soldier", a song written as a tribute to the National Guard. In 2009, 3 Doors Down, along with The Soul Children of Chicago, released the song "In the Presence of the Lord" on the compilation album Oh Happy Day: An All-Star Music Celebration.

In 2009, the band recorded a Christmas song called "Where My Christmas Lives", which was the first Christmas song Brad Arnold had ever written. It was digitally released along with seven acoustic songs on December 8. Six of these acoustic tracks were from the previous self-titled album, and one was an acoustic version of "Where my Christmas Lives".

Line-up changes: 2011–2013

3 Doors Down released their fifth studio album, Time of My Life, on July 19, 2011. The band had earlier released "When You're Young" as the first single from the album on January 10, 2011. The single reached a position of 81 on the US Billboard Hot 100. A second single from the album, "Every Time You Go" was released to digital outlets on May 23, 2011. The band embarked on a tour in July 2011 across the US, Europe, and the United Kingdom in support of the album. The album debuted at No. 3 on the Billboard 200, with 59,800 copies sold in its first week. Beginning in May 2012, the band embarked on a six-week-long 'Gang of Outlaws Tour' with headliners ZZ Top and opener Gretchen Wilson.

On May 23, 2012, Matt Roberts announced he was leaving the band to focus on his health. He told fans in a statement that "3 Doors Down will always have a special place in my heart and it saddens me to take this time off. But my health has to be my first priority". Guitarist Chris Henderson announced on Twitter that his old guitar tech Chet Roberts would be taking over from Matt Roberts on lead guitar.

After the "Gang of Outlaws" tour finished, the band said in an interview that they were entering the studio to record three or four new songs to put on their very first Greatest Hits album, which was released on November 19, 2012. During the tail end of the Gang of Outlaws tour, they debuted a new song "One Light" which was included on the band's The Greatest Hits. Guitarist Chris Henderson announced on Twitter they would be back in the studio a few weeks after the tour had ended. In late 2012, the band appeared at several smaller shows including one in Huntington, NY. The band performed at Download Festival 2013 at the Zippo Encore Stage on the Friday of the three-day festival. From the tailend of 2012 through to March 2013, 3 Doors Down went on a joint headlining tour with US rock band Daughtry to promote Daughtry's 3rd studio album release. The cover of "In the Air Tonight" was captured and uploaded to Daughtry's official YouTube channel. The band also played the Dubai Jazz Festival in February 2013.

On April 20, 2013, bassist Todd Harrell was charged with vehicular homicide for his actions the night before in Nashville, Tennessee. He was reportedly driving on I-40 at a high speed while under the influence of prescription medication when he caused an accident that killed 47-year-old Paul Howard Shoulders, Jr. The judge in the case harshly criticized the musician's doctor in the courtroom, accusing the physician of prescribing Harrell far too many pain pills. The judge stated that Harrell "got 360 Oxycodone and 60 Oxycontin pills from his doctor in less than 30 days, which is well outside the amount that is usually prescribed in the due course of medical treatment". Harrell was also charged with bringing a controlled substance into a correctional detention facility after it was discovered during the booking process at Nashville's Metro Jail that Harrell had a plastic bag hidden in his sock that contained eight Xanax pills, twenty four Oxycodone pills, and four Oxymorphone pills. Harrell's court and trial dates have been repeatedly postponed by Harrell's attorneys for various reasons, including a rehab stay. In December 2015, Harrell was sentenced to two years' imprisonment followed by six years of probation.

3 Doors Down later announced that the four scheduled shows in the U.S. for April and May had been cancelled out of respect for Shoulders and his family. The European tour with Prime Circle and the summer tour dates with Daughtry, which had been announced the day after the incident in Nashville, remained intact. On May 24, a week before the start on the European tour, Justin Biltonen, formerly of The Campaign 1984, was announced as the band's new bassist. The tour, starting in Moscow, Russia began on May 31, 2013. On July 20, 2013, they played live at the 2013 National Scout Jamboree at the Summit Bechtel Reserve.

Us and the Night and death of Matt Roberts: 2014–2018
In January 2014, Chris Henderson stated that their new album would be released sometime in the year. From the end of 2013 into 2014, the band embarked on an acoustic tour entitled "Songs from the Basement" and toured around the US. In February 2014, Todd Harrell was arrested in Mississippi once again for a DUI. Afterward, the band released a statement that Harrell was permanently out of the band, and that they would continue with Justin Biltonen as his replacement. In June, Henderson announced that the new album would be titled Us and the Night. It was originally set to be released between September and November 2015. In January 2016, the album's release date was finally revealed to be March 11, 2016. The band then went on tour around North America and in festivals such as Fort rock and Carolina Rebellion. 3 Doors Down toured the UK and Europe with multiple sold-out shows.

Former guitarist Matt Roberts died on August 20, 2016, at the age of 38 from a prescription drug overdose.

3 Doors Down performed at the presidential inauguration concert of U.S. President-elect Donald Trump on January 20, 2017. Arnold told TMZ that he was "proud" to perform and that he thinks it would be a "good experience". Fans of the band expressed mixed to negative feedback about it performing at the inauguration; the band received criticism and ridicule for playing at the event. 3 Doors Down's business manager, Angus Vail, explained to Vice the reasons behind the band's decision to perform by saying: "Well, 3 Doors actually played George W. Bush's inauguration. They are good Mississippi and Alabama boys — they come from conservative families. You know, they're really good guys, but they have very different political beliefs. Because they played both Bush's inaugurations, they've obviously been on the conservative radar." Vail continued that the band's choice to perform had a lot to do with their "God, guns, and country black-and-white sort of viewpoint" and that "they spend a lot of time going to Iraq, doing service, playing for the troops." In the week following the performance, the band's The Greatest Hits album reentered the Billboard 200 at a new peak of No. 94; the album had debuted and peaked at No. 100 in 2012 and had been off the chart since April 2016.

In 2018, 3 Doors Down embarked on the Rock n' Roll Express tour along with Collective Soul and opening act Soul Asylum. The tour had shows in 36 cities in the United States.

Upcoming seventh studio album: 2018–present
In July 2018, Brad Arnold stated that 3 Doors Down had been writing new material; "Who knows when we'll follow that one up. But we have been writing new songs. Maybe we'll release a single or a couple of new songs. We just might not release an album for a while. We still love creating new material — there's just not a market for it. But fans still like going out and seeing us." In August 2019, Arnold stated that the band would soon begin working on a follow-up to Us and the Night.

Other appearances
On February 9, 2010, the band released a song called "Shine", through digital media such as iTunes, which was used as a promotion for the 2010 Winter Olympics and is available through digital outlets. Billboard listed 3 Doors Down as the No. 30 band in the decade from 2000 to 2010.

On January 30, 2011, 3 Doors Down played during the 1st period intermission of the 2011 NHL All-Star Game in Raleigh, North Carolina. They played two songs: "When You're Young" followed by "Kryptonite". The band also held a free concert as part of the weekend festivities on January 28, 2011, in downtown Raleigh.

On June 28–29, 2014, 3 Doors Down played both days of the Americafest celebration at Kadena Air Base, Okinawa, Japan. They played all of their greatest hits and two new songs.

For a Mardi Gras celebration, the band performed at Universal Studios Florida on February 25, 2023.

The Better Life Foundation

3 Doors Down started The Better Life Foundation (TBLF) in 2003, with a goal in mind to give as many children as possible a better life. Since its inception TBLF has supported numerous charities across the US, including the Center for the Prevention of Child Abuse, and the Habitat for Humanity, as well as providing aid and assistance to the Gulf Coast region of Mississippi during Hurricane Katrina.  In 2006, Brad Arnold stated that approximately $900,000 had been raised.

When the Mississippi town of Waveland took an especially hard hit from Hurricane Katrina, the charity was able to purchase three police cars and a fire truck to help with rescue efforts. Also, in connection with Wal-Mart, they were able to supply the town with three semi-trucks full of rescue supplies. There was also extensive support from TBLF in providing funding for rebuilding efforts in the town.

3 Doors Down and The Better Life Foundation host a yearly show to raise money for the charity. Beginning in 2010, the show is performed at Horseshoe Hotel and Casino, in Tunica, Mississippi.  Prior to 2010, the show was performed at the Hard Rock Hotel and Casino in Biloxi, Mississippi. In addition to a concert from 3 Doors Down and friends, there is also an auction, which includes numerous items from musical friends, sports icons, and other various supporters of the band and the charity. There is an average of sixty items auctioned off yearly, and proceeds are given to TBLF. As of 2016, The Better Life Foundation annual benefit concert has been held at Harrah's Cherokee Casino Resort in Cherokee, North Carolina.
 
Past performers at the show include Lynyrd Skynyrd, Shinedown, Alter Bridge, Staind, Hinder, Switchfoot, Tracy Lawrence, Sara Evans, and others. Past auction items include a Paul Stanley guitar played on the KISS Farewell Tour, a total of four Roger Bourget motorcycles, access to the Dale Jr. racing suite, NASCAR artwork by Brad Daley, numerous signed guitars, and sports memorabilia.

Band members

Current members

 Brad Arnold – lead vocals (1996–present), drums (1996–2000)
 Chris Henderson – rhythm and lead guitar, backing vocals (1998–present)
 Greg Upchurch – drums (2005–present)
 Chet Roberts – lead and rhythm guitar, backing vocals (2012–present)
 Justin Biltonen – bass (2013–present)

Former members
 Matt Roberts – lead guitar, backing vocals (1996–2012; died 2016)
 Todd Harrell – bass (1996–2013)
 Richard Liles – drums (2000–2002)
 Daniel Adair – drums, backing vocals (2002–2005)

Timeline

Discography 

Studio albums
The Better Life (2000)
Away from the Sun (2002)
Seventeen Days (2005)
3 Doors Down (2008)
Time of My Life (2011)
Us and the Night (2016)

Accolades

References

External links

The Better Life Foundation
Chet Roberts Interview NAMM Oral History Library (2019)

 
Articles which contain graphical timelines
Alternative rock groups from Mississippi
American hard rock musical groups
American post-grunge musical groups
Musical groups established in 1996
Musical quintets
Republic Records artists
Universal Records artists